was a district located in northwestern Fukuoka Prefecture, Japan. Before its dissolution, the district comprised two towns: Shima (志摩町) and Nijō (二丈町). On January 1, 2010, the towns of Nijō and Shima – along with the city of Maebaru – were merged to create the city of Itoshima. Itoshima District was dissolved as a result of this merger.

Municipalities

Municipalities at the time of the formation
 Village of Imajuku (今宿村)
 Village of Susenji (周船寺村)
 Village of Motooka (元岡村)
 Village of Imazu (今津村)
 Village of Kitazaki (北崎村)
 Village of Maebaru (前原村)
 Village of Kafuri (加布里村)
 Village of Nagaito (長糸村)
 Village of Raizan (雷山村)
 Village of Ito (怡土村)
 Village of Hatae (波多江村)
 Village of Kaya (可也村)
 Village of Sakurano (桜野村)
 Village of Kofuji (小富士村)
 Village of Keya (芥屋村)
 Village of Ikisan (一貴山村)
 Village of Fukae (深江村)
 Village of Fukuyoshi (福吉村)

Municipal Timeline
 September 15, 1901 - The village of Maebaru was elevated to town status to become the town of Maebaru. (1 town, 17 villages)
 April 1, 1931 - The town of Maebaru, and the villages of Hatae and Kafuri were merged to create the town of Maebaru. (1 town, 15 villages)
 October 15, 1941 - The village of Imajuku was merged into the City of Fukuoka. (1 town, 14 villages)
 April 1, 1942 - The village of Imazu was merged into the city of Fukuoka. (1 town, 13 villages)
 January 1, 1955: (1 town, 6 villages)
 The town of Maebaru, and the villages of Raizan and Nagaito were merged to create the town of Maebaru.
 The villages of Ikisan, Fukae and Fukuyoshi were merged to create the village of Nijō.
 The villages of Kaya, Sakurano, Kofuji and Keya were merged to create the village of Shima.
 April 1, 1955 - The village of Ito was merged into the town of Maebaru. (1 town, 5 villages)
 April 1, 1961 - The villages of Motooka, Susenji and Kitazaki were merged into the city of Fukuoka. (1 town, 2 villages)
 April 1, 1965: (3 towns)
 The village of Nijō was elevated to town status to become the town of Nijō.
 The village of Shima was elevated to town status to become the town of Shima.
 October 1, 1992 - The town of Maebaru was elevated to city status to become the city of Maebaru. (2 towns)
 January 1, 2010 - The towns of Nijō and Shima, along with the city of Maebaru, were merged to create the city of Itoshima. Itoshima District was dissolved as a result of this merger.

See also
List of dissolved districts of Japan

References

Former districts of Fukuoka Prefecture